Orophea uniflora is a species of plant in the Annonaceae family. It is endemic to southern India.  It is threatened by habitat loss.

References

uniflora
Flora of Karnataka
Flora of Kerala
Flora of Tamil Nadu
Vulnerable plants
Taxonomy articles created by Polbot